Jesús Fernando Piñuelas Sandoval (born 27 March 1998) is a Mexican professional footballer who plays as a centre-back for Liga MX club Atlético San Luis.

Career statistics

Club

References

External links
 
 
 

Living people
1998 births
Association football defenders
Atlético San Luis footballers
Liga MX players
Liga Premier de México players
Tercera División de México players
Footballers from Baja California Sur
Mexican footballers